Semaeopus castaria is a moth of the family Geometridae first described by Achille Guenée in 1858. It is found on Hispaniola and Jamaica.

References

Moths described in 1858
Cosymbiini